Callia leucozonata is a species of beetle in the family Cerambycidae. It was described by Lane in 1973. It is known from Ecuador.

References

Calliini
Beetles described in 1973